Harem (Persian: حرمسرا haramsarā,  ḥarīm, "a sacred inviolable place; harem; female members of the family") refers to domestic spaces that are reserved for the women of the house in a Muslim family. A harem may house a man's wife or wives, their pre-pubescent male children, unmarried daughters, female domestic servants, and other unmarried female relatives. In harems of the past, slave  concubines were also housed in the harem. In former times some harems were guarded by eunuchs who were allowed inside. The structure of the harem and the extent of monogamy or polygamy has varied depending on the family's personalities, socio-economic status, and local customs. Similar institutions have been common in other Mediterranean and Middle Eastern civilizations, especially among royal and upper-class families, and the term is sometimes used in other contexts. In traditional Persian residential architecture the women's quarters were known as andaruni (Persian: اندرونی; meaning inside), and in the Indian subcontinent as zenana (Persian: زنانه).

Although the institution has experienced a sharp decline in the modern era due to a rise in education and economic opportunities for women, as well as the influence of Western culture, the seclusion of women is still practiced in some parts of the world, such as rural Afghanistan and conservative states of the Persian Gulf.

In the West, Orientalist conceptions of the harem as a hidden world of sexual subjugation where numerous women lounged in suggestive poses have influenced many paintings, stage productions, films and literary works. Some earlier European Renaissance paintings dating to the 16th century portray the women of the Ottoman harem as individuals of status and political significance. In many periods of Islamic history, women in the harem exercised various degrees of political power, such as the Sultanate of Women in the Ottoman Empire.

Terminology

The word has been recorded in the English language since the early 17th century. It comes from the Arabic ḥarīm, which can mean "a sacred inviolable place", "harem" or "female members of the family". In English the term harem can mean also "the wives (or concubines) of a polygamous man." The triliteral Ḥ-R-M appears in other terms related to the notion of interdiction such as haram (forbidden), mahram (unmarriageable relative), ihram (a pilgrim's state of ritual consecration during the Hajj) and al-Ḥaram al-Šarīf ("the noble sanctuary", which can refer to the Temple Mount or the sanctuary of Mecca).

In the Ottoman Turkish language, the harem, i.e., the part of the house reserved for women was called haremlik, while the space open for men was known as selamlık.

The practice of female seclusion is not exclusive to Islam, but the English word harem usually denotes the domestic space reserved for women in Muslim households. Some scholars have used the term to refer to polygynous royal households throughout history.

The ideal of seclusion

Leila Ahmed describes the ideal of seclusion as "a man's right to keep his women concealed—invisible to other men." Ahmed identifies the practice of seclusion as a social ideal and one of the major factors that shaped the lives of women in the Mediterranean Middle East.  For example, contemporary sources from the Byzantine Empire describe the social mores that governed women's lives. Women were not supposed to be seen in public. They were guarded by eunuchs and could only leave the home "veiled and suitably chaperoned." Some of these customs were borrowed from the Persians, but Greek society also influenced the development of patriarchal tradition.

The ideal of seclusion was not fully realized as social reality. This was in part because working-class women often held jobs that required interaction with men. In the Byzantine Empire, the very ideal of gender segregation created economic opportunities for women as midwives, doctors, bath attendants and artisans since it was considered inappropriate for men to attend to women's needs. At times women lent and invested money, and engaged in other commercial activities. Historical records shows that the women of 14th-century Mamluk Cairo freely visited public events alongside men, despite objections of religious scholars.

Female seclusion has historically signaled social and economic prestige. Eventually, the norms of female seclusion spread beyond the elites, but the practice remained characteristic of upper and middle classes, for whom the financial ability to allow one's wife to remain at home was a mark of high status. In some regions, such as the Arabian peninsula, seclusion of women was practiced by poorer families at the cost of great hardship, but it was generally economically unrealistic for the lower classes.

Where historical evidence is available, it indicates that the harem was much more likely to be monogamous. For example, in late Ottoman Istanbul, only 2.29 percent of married men were polygynous, with the average number of wives being 2.08. In some regions, like Sub-Saharan Africa and Southeast Asia, prevalence of women in agricultural work leads to wider practice of polygyny but makes seclusion impractical. In contrast, in Eurasian and North African rural communities that rely on male-dominated plough farming, seclusion is economically possible but polygyny is undesirable. This indicates that the fundamental characteristic of the harem is seclusion of women rather than polygyny.

Pre-Islamic background 

The idea of the harem or seclusion of women did not originate with Muhammad or Islam. The practice of secluding women was common to many Ancient Near East communities, especially where polygamy was permitted. In pre-Islamic Assyria and Persia, most royal courts had a harem, where the ruler's wives and concubines lived with female attendants, and eunuchs. Encyclopædia Iranica uses the term harem to describe the practices of the ancient Near East.

Ancient Egypt 

There has been a modern trend to refer to the women's quarters of the Pharaoh's palace in Ancient Egypt as a harem.

The popular assumption that Pharaonic Egypt had a harem is however an anachronism; while the women and children of the pharaoh, including his mother, wives, and children, had their own living quarters with its own administration in the Palace of the Pharaoh, the royal women did not live isolated from contact with men or in seclusion from the rest of the court in the way associated with the term "harem". The custom of referring to the women's quarters of the pharaoh's palace as a "harem" is therefore apocryphal, and has been used because of incorrect assumptions that Ancient Egypt was similar to later Islamic harem culture.

Assyria

The kings of Ancient Assyria are known to have had a harem regulated by royal edicts, in which the women lived in seclusion guarded by slave eunuchs.

A number of regulations were designed to prevent disputes among the women from developing into political intrigues. The women were guarded by the eunuchs who also prevented their disputes from developing into political plots, banned from giving gifts to their servants (as such gifts could be used as bribes) and not allowed any visitors who had not been examined and approved by officials. When the king traveled, his harem traveled with him, strictly supervised so as not breaking regulations even under transport.

In the 7th century BC, Assyria was conquered by the Median Empire, which appears to have adopted the harem custom, from whom it was in turn taken over by the Achaemenid Empire.

Greece and Byzantium

Female seclusion and a special part of the house reserved for women were common among the elites of ancient Greece, where it was known as the gynaeceum. However, while gender segregation was the official ideal in Classical Athens, it is debated how much of this ideal was actually enforced, and it is known that even upper-class women appeared in public and were able to come in contact with men on at least religious occasions.

These traditional Greek ideals were revived as an ideal for women in the Byzantine Empire (in which Greek culture eventually became dominant), though the rigid ideal norms of seclusion expressed in Byzantine literature did not necessarily reflect actual practice. The Byzantine Emperors were Greek Orthodox and did not have several wives - or official concubines - secluded in a harem. When Greek culture started to replace the Roman in the Byzantine Empire in the 6th century, it came to be seen as modest for especially upper-class women to keep to a special women's quarters (gynaikonitis), and until the 12th century, men and women are known to have participated in gender-segregated banquets at the Imperial Court; however Imperial women still appeared in public and did not live in seclusion, and the idealized gender segregation was never fully enforced.

The Median and Achaemenid Empires

There is no evidence of among early Iranians for harem practices, that is, to take large numbers of wives or concubines and keeping them in seclusion. However, Iranian dynasties are said to have adopted harem practices after their conquests in the Middle East, where such practices were used in some cultures such as Assyria (the Median Empire conquered Assyria in the 7th-century BC, and Media transformed into the Achaemenid Empire). According to Greek sources, the nobility of the Medes kept no less than five wives, who were watched over by eunuchs.

Greek historians have reported about the harems of the Achaemenid Empire. Herodotus reported that each Persian royal or aristocratic man had several wives and concubines, who came to the husband on a well-regulated turn-basis. and had sole control over their children until these were five years old.

The Old Persian word for the harem is not attested, but it can be reconstructed as xšapā.stāna (lit. night station or place where one spends the night). 
The royal household was controlled by the chief wife and queen, who as a rule was the daughter of a Persian prince and the mother of the heir to the throne, and who was subject only to the king, with her own living quarter, revenue, estates and staff, which included eunuchs and concubines.
The second rank under the queen consisted of the legal secondary wives, with the title bānūka (“Lady”); the third rank consisted of unmarried princesses as well as the married princesses who lived with their own family, with the title duxçī (daughter), The fourth group of women in the harem were the royal slave concubines, who were bought in slave markets, received as a gifts  or tribute  or taken as prisoners of war. The concubines were trained to entertain the king and his guests as musicians, dancers and singers. The harem of Darius III reportedly consisted of his mother, queen-wife, children, over 300 concubines and nearly 500 household servants.

However, it is a matter of debate if the Achaemenid court had a full harem culture, as women do not appear to have been fully secluded in the harem. The fact that women lived in separate quarters at the Royal Palace does not necessarily mean that they were secluded from contact with men, and despite the (possibly biased) Greek reports, there is no archeological evidence supporting the existence of a harem, or the seclusion of women from contact with men, at the Achaemenid court.

Royal and aristocratic Achaemenid women were given an education in subjects which did not appear compatible with seclusion, such as horsemanship and archery. It does not appear that royal and aristocratic women lived in seclusion from men since it is known that they appeared in public and traveled with their husbands, participated in hunting  and in feasts: at least the chief wife of a royal or aristocratic man did not live in seclusion, as it is clearly stated that wives customarily accompanied their husbands to dinner banquets, although they left the banquet when the “women entertainers” of the harem came in and the men began "merrymaking".

Little is known about the alleged harems of the Parthians. Parthian royal men reportedly had several wives and kept them fairly secluded from all men but relatives and eunuchs. According to Roman sources, Parthian kings had harems full of female slaves and hetairas secluded from contact with men, and royal women were not allowed to participate in the royal banquets. Also aristocratic Parthian men appear to have had harems, as Roman sources report of rich men travelling with hundreds of guarded concubines. However, the Roman reports about Parthian harems seem to mirror the traditional Greek reports about the Achaemenid harems, and they similarly are biased, and cannot be verified by archeological evidence.

Sasanian Empire

The information about the Sasanian harem reveals a picture that closely mirrors the alleged Achaemenid customs.

In the Sassanian Empire, Roman reports that it was common for men to have multiple wives. The hierarchy of the Sassanian harem is not clear. The Sassanian kings had one chief consort, who was the mother of the heir to the throne, as well as several wives of lower rank and concubines, all of whom accompanied him on travels, even on campaigns. Five titles are attested for royal women: “royal princess” (duxšy, duxt); “Lady” (bānūg); “Queen” (bānbišn); “Queen of the Empire” ([Ērān]šahr bānbišn) and “Queen of Queens” (bānbišnān bānbišn). The rank of these titles has been the matter of debate and it appears that their status varied depending on circumstances and that the highest female rank was not necessarily borne by the chief wife, but could be held by a daughter or a sister. The Sasanian harem was supervised by eunuchs, and also had female singers and musicians.

However, while the Sasanian kings had harems, women in the Sassanid Empire in general did not live in seclusion and elaborate harems were detested and appear to have been exceptions to the rule, which is illustrated by the fact that big harems when they occurred, were abhorred by the public.

According to Sasanian legend, of all the Persian kings, Khosrow II was the most extravagant in his hedonism. He searched his realm to find the most beautiful girls, and it was rumored that about 3,000 of them were kept in his harem. This practice was widely condemned by the public, who abhorred of him keeping those girls in seclusion and denying them the benefit of marriage and progeny, and it was counted as the fourth of the eight crimes for which he was later tried and executed. Khosrow himself claimed that he sent his favorite wife Shirin every year to offer them a possibility of leaving his harem with a dowry for marriage, but that their luxurious lifestyle always prompted them to refuse his offer.

South Asia

South Asian traditions of female seclusion, called purdah, may have been influenced by Islamic customs, but the practice of segregation by gender in Hindu society predates the Muslim conquests in the Indian subcontinent.

Ashoka, the emperor of the Maurya Empire in India, kept a harem of around 500 women, all of whom were under strict rules of seclusion and etiquette.

In Islamic cultures

Umayyad and Abbasid Caliphates

In contrast to the earlier era of the Islamic prophet Muhammad and the Rashidun Caliphate, women in Umayyad and Abbasid society were absent from all arenas of the community's central affairs. While it was very common for early Muslim women to play an active role in community life, and not unseen for women to lead men into battle and even start rebellions as demonstrated in the Hadith literature, by the time of the Abbasid Caliphate, women were ideally kept in seclusion.

The practice of gender segregation in Islam was influenced by an interplay of religion, customs and politics.The harem system first became fully institutionalized in the Islamic world under the Abbasid caliphate. Seclusion of women was established in various communities of the Mediterranean, Mesopotamia, and Persia before the advent of Islam, and some scholars believe that Muslims adopted the custom from the Byzantine Empire and Persia, retrospectively interpreting the Quran to justify it. Although the term harem does not denote women's quarters in the Quran, a number of Quranic verses discussing modesty and seclusion were held up by Quranic commentators as religious rationale for the separation of women from men, including the so-called hijab verse (33:53). In modern usage hijab colloquially refers to the religious attire worn by Muslim women, but in this verse, it meant "veil" or "curtain" that physically separates female from male space. Although classical commentators agreed that the verse spoke about a curtain separating the living quarters of Muhammad's wives from visitors to his house, they usually viewed this practice as providing a model for all Muslim women.

The growing seclusion of women were illustrated by the power struggle between the Caliph Al-Hadi and his mother Al-Khayzuran, who refused to live in seclusion but instead challenged the power of the Caliph by giving her own audiences to male supplicants and officials and thus mixing with men. Her son considered this improper, and he publicly addressed the issue of his mothers public life by assembling his generals and asked them: 
'Who is the better among us, you or me?' asked Caliph al-Hadi of his audience. 
'Obviously you are the better, Commander of the Faithful,' the assembly replied.
'And whose mother is the better, mine or yours?' continued the caliph.
'Your mother is the better, Commander of the Faithful.'
'Who among you', continued al-Hadi, 'would like to have men spreading news about your mother?'
'No one likes to have his mother talked about,' responded those present.
'Then why do men go to my mother to speak to her?'

Conquests had brought enormous wealth and large numbers of slaves to the Muslim elite. The majority of the slaves were women and children, many of whom had been dependents or harem-members of the defeated Sassanian upper classes. In the wake of the conquests an elite man could potentially own a thousand slaves, and ordinary soldiers could have ten people serving them.

Nabia Abbott, preeminent historian of elite women of the Abbasid Caliphate, describes the lives of harem women as follows.
The choicest women were imprisoned behind heavy curtains and locked doors, the strings and keys of which were entrusted into the hands of that pitiable creature – the eunuch. As the size of the harem grew, men indulged to satiety. Satiety within the individual harem meant boredom for the one man and neglect for the many women. Under these conditions ... satisfaction by perverse and unnatural means crept into society, particularly in its upper classes.

The marketing of human beings, particularly women, as objects for sexual use meant that elite men owned the vast majority of women they interacted with, and related to them as would masters to slaves. Being a slave meant relative lack of autonomy, and belonging to a harem caused a wife and her children to have little insurance of stability and continued support due to the volatile politics of harem life.

Elite men expressed in literature the horror they felt for the humiliation and degradation of their daughters and female relatives. For example, the verses addressed to Hasan ibn al-Firat on the death of his daughter read:
 To Abu Hassan I offer condolences.
 At times of disaster and catastrophe
 God multiplies rewards for the patient.
 To be patient in misery
 Is equivalent to giving thanks for a gift.
 Among the blessings of God undoubtedly
 Is the preservation of sons
 And the death of daughters.

Even so, courtesans and princesses produced prestigious and important poetry. Enough survives to give us access to women's historical experiences, and reveals some vivacious and powerful figures, such as the Sufi mystic Raabi'a al-Adwiyya (714–801 CE), the princess and poet 'Ulayya bint al-Mahdi (777–825 CE), and the singing-girls Shāriyah (–70 CE), Fadl Ashsha'ira (d. 871 CE) and Arib al-Ma'muniyya (797–890 CE).

Al-Andalus

The harem system developed in the Umayyad and Abbasid Caliphates was reproduced by the Islamic realms which developed from them, such as in the Emirates and Caliphates in Muslim Spain, Al-Andalus, which attracted a lot of attention in Europe during the Middle Ages until the Emirate of Granada was conquered in 1492.

The most famous of the Andalusian harems was perhaps the harem of the Caliph of Cordoba. Except for the female relatives of the Caliph, the harem women consisted of his slave concubines. The slaves of the Caliph were often European saqaliba slaves trafficked from Northern or Eastern Europe; while male saqaliba could be given work in a number of tasks such as offices in the kitchen, falconry, mint, textile workshops, the administration or the royal guard (in the case of harem guards, they were castrated), female saqaliba were placed in the harem.

The harem could contain thousands of slave concubines; the harem of Abd al-Rahman I consisted of 6,300 women. They (the saqaliba concubines) were appreciated for their light skin. The concubines (jawaris) were educated in accomplishments to make them attractive and useful for their master, and many became known and respected for their knowledge in a variety of subjects from music to medicine.
A jawaris concubine who gave birth to a child attained the status of an umm walad, and a favorite concubine was given great luxury and honorary titles such as Marjan, who gave birth to al-Hakam II, the heir of Abd al-Rahman III, who called her al-sayyida al-kubra (great lady).
Concubines were however always slaves subjected to lack of freedom and the will of their master, and Caliph Abd al-Rahman III is known to have executed two concubines for reciting what he saw as inappropriate verses and tortured another concubine with a burning candle when she refused sexual intercourse; the concubines of Caliph Abu Marwan al-Tubni (d. 1065) were reportedly so badly treated that they conspired to murder him, and women of the harem are also known to have been subjected to rape when rivaling factions conquered different palaces. Several concubines are known to have had great influence through their masters or their sons, notably Subh during the Caliphate of Cordoba, and Isabel de Solís during the Emirate of Granada.

Afghanistan

The rulers of Afghanistan customarily had a harem of four official wives as well as a large number of unofficial wives for the sake of tribal marriage diplomacy. 
They also had a large amount of enslaved women in the royal harem known as kaniz and surati, guarded by the ghulam bacha (eunuchs).  Habibullah Khan (r. 1901–1919) famously had at least 44 wives and hundreds of slave women (mostly Hazara) in his harem in the Harem Sara Palace.  The women of the royal harem dressed in Western fashion since at least the reign Habibullah Khan but did not show themselves other than completely covered outside of the enclosed area of the royal palace.  The royal harem were first abolished by king Amanullah Khan who in 1923 freed all slaves of the royal harem as well as encouraged his wife queen Soraya Tarzi and the other women of the royal family to unveil and live public lives.  While the royal women returned to the purdah of the royal complex after the deposition of Amanullah in 1929, it was finally dissolved with the final unveiling of the royal women in 1959.

Crimean Khanate

In the Muslim dynasties of Central Asia, the harem culture did not initially exist, since the customary nomad culture made it impractical. The wives of the rulers of the Golden Horde did not live secluded in a harem but was allowed to show themselves and meet unrelated men, and the system of harem gender segregation was not fully implemented in the Islamic dynasties of Central Asia until they stopped living a nomadic lifestyle, such as in the Crimea.

The household organization of the khans of the Giray dynasty in the Crimean Khanate is described first in the reign of Sahib I Giray, while most court offices were initiated by Sahib I Giray.  It is clear that there were separate women's quarters in the court of Sahib I Giray, however complete gender segregation in the form of a harem does not appear to have been introduced until the 1560s.

The Giray court appear to have been organized in the slave household normal in other Muslim dynasties, and many of the officials and courtiers (such as the viziers and equerries) as well as the servants were enslaved, while some were free Muslim noble clients and ulema family members.  The servants of the royal harem however were all clearly slaves, particularly the eunuchs, who guarded the harem and who were of Black African origin, imported from Africa via the Ottoman Empire and the Middle East and often trained in the Ottoman Imperial harem.

Inside the harem, the highest positions were that of ana biyim and ulug biyim (ulug hani), which were given to the khan's mother and to the khan's first wife or the eldest Giray princess, respectively. The royal women had their own property and administered their property from the harem through their legal agents, known as vekils, who also acted as their intermediaries with supplicants and petitioners.

The princes and the khans normally married free Muslim daughters of the Circassian vassal begs, and trusted high officials; the khans also customarily practiced levirate marriage.  Similar to what was normal in the royal harem of other Islamic dynasties, the khans had four official wives (all with their own separate quarters within the harem), and an unknown number of enslaved concubines.  In 1669, the khan reportedly received fifteen Circassian slave virgins as an annual tribute from his subjects in the Caucasus; in the 1720s khan Saadet Giray reportedly owned twenty-seven slave concubines, and in the 1760s khan Qirim Giray owned about forty.  But not all slave concubines were Circassians: some royal children are recorded to have been born by slave mothers from Central and Eastern Europe, but the occurrence of European women in the royal harem diminished in the 18th century when the Crimean slave raids to Eastern Europe were suppressed.  Some of these women, though all formally concubines, would not have been the khan's concubines in practice but rather acted as the servants of his wives; this was the case in the Royal Ottoman harem as well, which served as the role model of the Giray harem.
The Giray princesses were normally married off to poor noblemen and vassals who would be provided with great dowries, which put the princesses in advantage to their husbands and made the husbands loyal to the Girays.

Initially, the royal women did not live in seclusion in the harem; they notably gave their own audiences to men, significantly the ceremonial visit of the Russian ambassador, who presented them with diplomatic gifts, but in 1564 the Russian ambassador was met with the message that such audiences were no longer to be given.  The Giray women did continue to play a role in diplomacy, as they were allowed to exchange formal diplomatic correspondence with female rulers and consorts. Ğazı II Giray assigned his wife Han Tokai to act as a mediator and write to tsaritsa Irina Godunova, while he himself wrote to tsar Feodor I, negotiating the return of their son Murad Giray from Moscow in 1593.

There are few examples of politically active and influential women of the Giray harem. Only Nur Sultan, wife of Mengli I Giray, Ayse Sultan, wife of Devlet I Giray (r. 1551–1577) and Emine Sultan Biyim, wife of Mehmed IV Giray (1642–44 and 1654–66), have been historically acknowledged as politically influential.

Khedivate of Egypt

The royal harem during the Khedivate of Egypt (1805-1914) was modelled after Ottoman example, the khedives being the Egyptian vice roys of the Ottoman sultans. Similar to the Ottoman Imperial harem, the harem of the khedive was modelled on a system of polygyny based on slave concubinage, in which each wife or concubine was limited to having one son.

The khedive's harem was composed of between several hundreds to over a thousand enslaved women, supervised by his mother, the walida pasha, and his four official wives (hanim) and recognized concubines (qadin).   However, the majority of the slave women served as domestics to his mother and wives and could have servant offices such as the bash qalfa, chief servant slave woman of the walida pasha.  The enslaved female servants of the khedive harem were manumitted and married off with a trousseau in strategic marriages to the male slaves (kul or mamluk) who were trained to become officers and civil servants, in order to ensure the fidelity of their husband's to the khedive when they begun their military or state official career.  A minority of the slave women were selected to become the personal servants (concubines) of the khedive, often selected by his mother: they could become his wives, and would in any case become free as an umm walad (or mustawlada) if they had children with him. The Egyptian elite of bureaucrate families, who emulated the khedive, had similar harem customs, and it was noted that it was common for Egyptian upper-class families to have slave women in their harem, which they manumitted to marry off to male protegees.   Muhammad Ali of Egypt reportedly had at least 25 consorts (wives and concubines), and Khedive Ismail fourteen.

This system started to change in 1873, when Tewfik Pasha married Emina Ilhamy as his sole consort, making monogamy the fashionable ideal among the elite, after the throne succession had been changed to primogeniture, which favored monogamy. Around the same time, the Tanzimat reforms abolished the custom of training male slaves to become military men and civil servants and replaced them with free students.  The Anglo-Egyptian Convention for the Abolition of Slavery in 1877 officially banned the slave trade to Sudan, followed by the 1884 ban on the import of white women as slaves (the harem slave women were normally Circassian), a ban on the selling on existing slaves as well as the introduction of a law giving slaves the right to apply of manumission.  All this gradually diminished the royal harem, though the royal harem as well as the harem of the elite families did still maintain a smaller number of both male eunuchs as well as slave women until at least World War I; Khedive Abbas II of Egypt bought six "white female slaves" for his harem in 1894, and his mother still maintained sixty slaves as late as 1931.  The royal harem was finally dissolved when the royal women escaped seclusion and took on a public role in the 1930s.

Morocco

Moulay Ismail, Alaouite sultan of Morocco from 1672 to 1727, had over 500 (enslaved) concubines. He is said to have fathered a total of 525 sons and 342 daughters by 1703 and achieved a 700th son in 1721.

Many of his concubines are only fragmentary documented. As concubines, they were slave captives, sometimes from Europe. One of them, an Irishwoman by the name Mrs. Shaw, was brought to his harem after having been enslaved and was made to convert to Islam when the Sultan wished to have intercourse with her, but was manumitted and married off to a Spanish convert when the Sultan grew tired of her; the Spanish convert being very poor, she was described by contemporary witnesses as reduced to beggary. Other slave concubines became favorites and as such were allowed some influence, such as an Englishwoman called Lalla Balqis. Another favorite was a Spanish captive renamed Al-Darah, mother to Moulay Ismail's once favorite son that he himself educated: Moulay Mohammed al-Alim; and to Moulay Sharif. Around 1702, Al-Darah tragically died strangled by Moulay Ismail whom Lalla Aisha had made believe she had betrayed him. 

According to the writings of the French diplomat Dominique Busnot, Moulay Ismail had at least 500 concubines and even more children. A total of 868 children (525 sons and 343 daughters) is recorded in 1703, with his seven hundredth son being born shortly after his death in 1727, by which time he had well over a thousand children. The final total is uncertain: the Guinness Book of Records claims 1042, while Elisabeth Oberzaucher and Karl Grammer of the University of Vienna put the total at 1171. This is widely considered among the largest number of children of any human in history.

Mughal Empire

The king's wives, concubines, dancing girls and slaves were not the only women of the Mughal harem. Many others, including the king's mother, lived in the harem. Aunts, grandmothers, sisters, daughters and other female relatives of the king all lived in the harem. Male children also lived in the harem until they grew up. Within the precincts of the harem were markets, bazaars, laundries, kitchens, playgrounds, schools and baths. The harem had a hierarchy, its chief authorities being the wives and female relatives of the emperor and below them were the concubines.

Urdubegis were the class of women assigned to protect the emperor and inhabitants of the zenana. Because the women of the Mughal court lived sequestered under purdah, the administration of their living quarters was run entirely by women. The division of the administrative tasks was dictated largely by the vision of Akbar, who organized his zenana of over 5,000 noble women and servants. The women tasked with the protection of the zenana were commonly of Habshi, Tatar, Turk and Kashmiri origin. Kashmiri women were selected because they did not observe purdah. Many of the women were purchased as slaves and trained for their positions.

The women of the Mughal harem could exercise enormous political power. Nur Jahan, chief consort of Jahangir, was the most powerful and influential woman at court during a period when the Mughal Empire was at the peak of its power and glory. More decisive and proactive than her husband, she is considered by historians to have been the real power behind the throne for more than fifteen years. Nur Jahan was granted certain honours and privileges which were never enjoyed by any Mughal empress before or after. Nur Jahan was the only Mughal empress to have coinage struck in her name. She was often present when the Emperor held court, and even held court independently when the Emperor was unwell. She was given charge of his imperial seal, implying that her perusal and consent were necessary before any document or order received legal validity. The Emperor sought her views on most matters before issuing orders. The only other Mughal empress to command such devotion from her husband was Nur Jahan's niece Mumtaz Mahal, for whom Shah Jahan built the Taj Mahal as a mausoleum. However, Mumtaz took no interest in affairs of state and Nur Jahan is therefore unique in the annals of the Mughal Empire for the political influence she wielded.

Ottoman Empire

The Imperial Harem of the Ottoman sultan, which was also called seraglio in the West, was part of Topkapı Palace. It also housed the valide sultan, as well as the sultan's daughters and other female relatives. Eunuchs and servant girls were also part of the harem. During the later periods, the sons of the sultan lived in the Harem until they were 12 years old.It is being more commonly acknowledged today that the purpose of harems during the Ottoman Empire was for the upbringing of the future wives of upper-class and royal men. These women would be educated so that they were able to appear in public as a wife. In general, however, the separation of men's and women's quarters was never practiced among the urban poor in large cities such as Constantinople, and by the 1920s and 1930s, it had become a thing of the past in middle and upper-class homes.

Some women of Ottoman harem, especially wives, mothers and sisters of sultans, played very important political roles in Ottoman history, and during the period of the Sultanate of Women, it was common for foreign visitors and ambassadors to claim that the Empire was, de facto ruled by the women in the Imperial Harem. Hürrem Sultan (wife of Suleiman the Magnificent, mother of Selim II), was one of the most powerful women in Ottoman history and wielded vast political power. The title of Haseki Sultan, was created for her and was used by her successors.

Kösem Sultan was one of the most powerful women in Ottoman history. Kösem Sultan achieved power and influenced the politics of the Ottoman Empire when she became Haseki Sultan as favourite consort and later legal wife of Ottoman Sultan Ahmed I (r. 1603–1617) and valide sultan as mother of Murad IV (r. 1623–1640) and Ibrahim (r. 1640–1648), and grandmother of Mehmed IV (r. 1648–1687).

Kösem's son, Sultan Ibrahim the Mad, Ottoman ruler from 1640 to 1648, is said to have drowned 280 concubines of his harem in the Bosphorus. At least one of his concubines, Turhan Sultan, a Rus' girl (from the area around modern Ukraine) who came into the Ottoman Empire as a slave sold by Nogai slavers, survived his reign.

Safavid Empire

The royal harem played an important role in the history of Safavid Persia. The Safavid harem consisted of mothers, wives, slave concubines and female relatives, and was staffed with female slaves and with eunuchs who acted as their guards and channel to the rest of the world. Shah Sultan Hossain's (r. 1694–1722) court has been estimated to include five thousand slaves; male and female, black and white, of which one hundred were black eunuchs.

The monarchs of the Safavid dynasty preferred to procreate through slave concubines, which would neutralize potential ambitions from relatives and other inlaws and protect patrimony. The slave concubines (and later mothers) of the Shah's mainly consisted of enslaved Circassian, Georgian and Armenian women, captured as war booty, bought at the slave market or received as gifts from local potentates. The slave concubines were sometimes forced to convert to shia Islam upon entering the harem, and referred to as kaniz. In contrast to the common custom in Islamic courts to allow only non-Muslim women to become harem concubines, the Safavid harem also contained Muslim concubines, as some free Persian Muslim daughters were gifted by their families or taken by the royal household to the harem as concubines.

The enslaved harem women could achieve great influence, but there are also examples of the opposite: Shah Abbas II (r. 1642–1666) burned three of his slave-wives alive because they refused to drink with him, as well as another wife for lying about her menstruation period, and Shah Safi (r. 1629–1642) stabbed his wife to death for disobedience.

Slave eunuchs performed various tasks in many levels of the harem as well as the general court. Eunuchs had offices in the general court, such as in the royal treasury and as the tutors and adoptive fathers of non-castrated slaves selected to be slave soldiers (ghilman), as well as inside the harem, and served as a channel between the secluded harem women and the outside court and world, which gave them a potentially powerful role at court.

In the early Safavid period, young princes were placed in the care of a lala (high-ranking Qizilbash chief who acted as a guardian) and eventually given charge of important governorates. Although this system had the danger of encouraging regional rebellions against the shah, it gave the princes education and training which prepared them for dynastic succession. This policy was changed by Shah Abbas I (1571-1629), who "largely banished" the princes to the harem, where their social interactions were limited to the ladies of the harem and eunuchs. This deprived them of administrative and military training as well as experience of dealing with the aristocracy of the realm, which, together with the princes' indulgent upbringing, made them not only unprepared to carry out royal responsibilities, but often also uninterested in doing so. The confinement of royal princes to the harem was an important factor contributing to the decline of the Safavid dynasty.

The administration of the royal harem constituted an independent branch of the court, staffed mainly by eunuchs. These were initially black eunuchs, but white eunuchs from Georgia also began to be employed from the time of Abbas I.

The mothers of rival princes together with eunuchs engaged in palace intrigues in an attempt to place their candidate on the throne. From the middle of the sixteenth century, rivalries between Georgian and Circassian women in the royal harem gave rise to dynastic struggles of an ethnic nature previously unknown at the court. When Shah Abbas II died in 1666, palace eunuchs engineered the succession of Suleiman I and effectively seized control of the state. Suleiman set up a privy council, which included the most important eunuchs, in the harem, thereby depriving traditional state institutions of their functions. The eunuchs' influence over military and civil affairs was checked only by their internal rivalries and the religious movement led by Muhammad Baqir Majlisi. The royal harem reached such proportions under Sultan Husayn (1668–1726) that it consumed a large part of state revenues. After the fall of the Safavid dynasty, which occurred soon afterwards, eunuchs were never again able to achieve significant political influence as a class in Persia.

Uzbekistan

In the Islamic Khanates of Central Asia, harems existed until the introduction of Communism by the Soviets after the Russian Revolution.

The royal harem of the ruler of the Khanate of Khiva (1511-1920) in Central Asia (Uzbekistan) was composed of both legal wives and slave concubines. The khan had four legal wives, who were obliged to be practicing Muslim women.

Aside from his legal wives, enslaved women were acquired from slave markets. These were obliged to be non-Muslims since Muslims could not be slaves. The enslaved girls were initially given as servants to the khan's mother. She provided them with an education after some of them were selected to be the concubines to the khan.

Only the khan's legal wives were allowed to give birth to his children, and the slave concubines who conceived were given a forced abortion. The women could be sold off if they did not please the khan, or given in marriage to his favored subjects. The son of the khan were not allowed to inherit his father's concubine, so when a khan died, his concubines were sold at the slave market.  Men were normally not allowed to visit the harem, but Jewish tradeswomen were allowed in to sell their wares, such as clothes, to the harem inhabitants.

The royal harem of the ruler of the Emirate of Bukhara (1785-1920) in Central Asia (Uzbekistan) was similar to that of the Khanate of Khiva. The last Emir of Bukhara was reported to have a harem with 100 women, but also a separate "harem" of ‘nectarine-complexioned dancing boys’. The harem was abolished when the Soviet conquered the area and the khan was forced to flee; he reportedly left the harem women behind, but did take some of his dancing boys with him.

Qajar Empire

The harem of the monarchs of the Qajar dynasty (1785-1925) consisted of several thousand people. The harem had a precise internal administration, based on the women's rank.

As was customary in Muslim harems, the highest rank of the harem hierarchy was that of the monarchs' mother, who in Qajar Iran had the title Mahd-e ʿOlyā (Sublime Cradle). She had many duties and prerogatives, such as safeguarding the harem valuables, particularly the jewels, which she administered with the help of female secretaries.

In contrast to what was common in the Ottoman Empire, where the sultans normally only had slave consorts, the Qajar shah's also had a custom of diplomatic marriages with free Muslim women, daughters of Qajar dignitaries and princes. Another phenomena of the Qajar harem was that the Shah entered two different kinds of marriages with his harem women: ṣīḡa (temporary wife), which was often done with concubines, and ʿaqdī (permanent wife), which was a promotion. The wives and slave concubines of Fath-Ali Shah Qajar came from the harems of the vanquished houses of Zand and Afšār; from the Georgian and Armenian campaigns, as well as from the slave markets and presented as gifts to the shah from the provinces.

Every consort had white and black slave servants (women or eunuchs), whose number varied according to her status. Some wives had their own residence and stables. There were different types of female officials within the harem: some managed the royal coffeehouse inside the harem; a body of female sentinels commanded by women officials "protected the king's nightly rest"; women called ostāds (masters), supervised the group of female dancers and musicians who entertained the harem and were housed with their servants in a separate compound. Young slave boys below puberty (ḡolām-bačča) served as servants and playmates in the harem. Eunuchs were mainly African slaves.

The women of the harem were responsible for everything inside the harem quarters, but the harem were guarded from the other parts of the palace (biruni) by the eunuchs, who together with the visits from relatives, physicians and tailors served as links to the outside world for the women, but the women were not allowed to leave the harem themselves.

The harem women had daily entertainments such as music, dance, theatrical performances and games. They studied the arts, calligraphy and poetry, and entertained themselves and the shah with music, dance and singing, and by reciting verses and telling stories, which the shah enjoyed at bedtime. The harem had its own theatre where passion plays (taʿzia) were performed, and one of the shah's wives was the custodian of all the paraphernalia. Toward the end of the Qajar dynasty, foreign tutors were allowed into the harem.

Inside the harem, women performed religious functions such as rawża-ḵᵛāni (commemoration of the martyrdom of Imam Ḥosayn at Karbalā); preached from the pulpit on the day of ʿĀšurā (q.v., the 10th of Moḥarram) and direct the ritual of sina-zadan (beating of the chest).

The Qajar harem also had the political influence and intrigues common in royal harems. Until a regulated succession order to the throne was established by Nāṣer-al-Din Shah (r. 1848–1896), the harem was a place of intense struggle by mothers of potential heirs to have their own sons elected heir to the throne as well as material benefits for themselves, higher ranks for members of their own families, or precedence for their own children. Nāṣer-al-Din Shah's mother Jahān Ḵānom Mahd-e ʿOlyā wielved a major influenced with secured his own succession and the dismissal and subsequent assassination in of Prime Minister Mirzā Taqi Khan Amir Kabir, and Nāṣer-al-Din Shah's favorite wife Anis-al-Dawla brought about the dismissal of the Premier Mirza Hosein Khan Moshir od-Dowleh in 1873. Both Persian policymakers as well as foreign diplomats, therefore, sought support within the royal harem.

Modern Era
The practice of female seclusion witnessed a sharp decline in the early 20th century as a result of education and increased economic opportunity for women, as well as Western influences, but it is still practiced in some parts of the world, such as rural Afghanistan and conservative states of the Persian Gulf region. Since the early 1980s, a rise in conservative Islamic currents has led to a greater emphasis on traditional notions of modesty and gender segregation, with some radical preachers in Saudi Arabia calling for a return to seclusion of women and an end of female employment. Many working women in conservative societies have adopted hijab as a way of coping with a social environment where men are uncomfortable interacting with women in the public space. Some religious women have tried to emulate seclusion practices abandoned by their grandmothers' generation in an effort to affirm traditional religious values in the face of pervasive Westernization.

Eunuchs and slavery

Eunuchs were probably introduced into Islamic civilizations (despite castration being Islamically forbidden) through the influence of Persian and Byzantine imperial courts. The Ottomans employed eunuchs as guardians of the harem. Istanbul's Topkapı Palace housed several hundred eunuchs in the late-sixteenth century. The head eunuch who guarded the entrance of the harem was known as kızlar ağası. Eunuchs were either Nilotic slaves captured in the Nile vicinity and transported through ports in Upper Egypt, the Sudan and Abyssinia, or European slaves such as Slavs and Franks.

According to Encyclopedia of Islam, castration was prohibited in Islamic law "by a sort of tacit consensus" and eunuchs were acquired from Christian and Jewish traders. Al-Muqaddasi identifies a town in Spain where the operation was performed by Jews and the survivors were then sent overseas. Encyclopedia Judaica states that Talmudic law counts castration among mutilations entitling a slave to immediate release so that the ability of Jewish slave traders to supply eunuchs to harems depended on whether they could acquire castrated males.

The dark eunuch was held as the embodiment of the sensual tyranny that held sway in the fantasized Ottoman palace, for he had been "clipped" or "completely sheared" to make of him the "ultimate slave" for the supreme ruler. In the Ottoman court, white eunuchs, who were mostly brought from castration centers in Christian Europe and Circassia, were responsible for much of the palace administration, while black eunuchs, who had undergone a more radical form of castration, were the only male slaves employed in the royal harem.

The chief black eunuch, or the Kizlar Agha, came to acquire a great deal of power within the Ottoman Empire. He not only managed every aspect of the Harem women's lives but was also responsible for the education and social etiquette of the princes and young women in the Harem. He arranged for all ceremonial events within the Harem including weddings and circumcision parties, and even notified women of death sentences when "accused of crimes or implicated in intrigues of jealousy and corruption."

Nineteenth-century travelers accounts tell of being served by black eunuch slaves. The trade was suppressed in the Ottoman Empire beginning in the mid-19th century, and slavery was legally abolished in 1887 or 1888. Late 19th-century slaves in Palestine included enslaved Africans and the sold daughters of poor Palestinian peasants. Both Arabs and Jews owned slaves. Circassians and Abazins from North of the Black Sea may also have been involved in the Ottoman slave trade.

Non-Islamic equivalents

African royal polygamy
In Africa south of the Sahara, many non-Muslim chieftains have traditionally had harems. 

The Zulu King Goodwill Zwelithini had six wives, for example, and members of the Nigerian chieftaincy system have historically had as many as three hundred of them.  Usually, African royal polygamy does not expect for the wives to be secluded from men or to be prevented from moving outside of the harem. Where this is not the case, and the royal wives do live in the harems in isolation, they tend to have a ritual significance in their kingdoms' traditions. 

The wives of the Oba of Benin City, a Nigerian kingdom, lived alone in the women's quarters of the Royal Palace; they were allowed to receive female visitors, but no male ones were allowed to enter the harem, and they themselves normally did not leave it and thus were never seen in public. As stated above, their seclusion was tied to the religion of Benin City, which held them to be sacred due to their position as wives of the Oba.

Aztec Empire
In Mexico, Aztec ruler Montezuma II, who met Cortés, kept 4,000 concubines; every member of the Aztec nobility was supposed to have had as many consorts as he could afford.

Cambodia

There were no support for a harem in Buddhist writings. However, harems have nevertheless been common for Buddhist royal rulers.  Normally, the royal Buddhist harems of South East Asia were not as strict as Muslim harems and did allow the women some limited freedom outside of the harem, but the royal harem of Cambodia was particularly severe, and secluded women for fear that they would be unfaithful.

The king of Cambodia had a royal harem consisting of hundreds of women. In a custom common for royal rulers in South East Asia, girls were sent to the king's harem by powerful local families all over the country, as tributes and living acknowledgements of their submission, and the king's right to rule.   The girls sent to the harem became court ladies and given a number of different tasks. After every coronation, the new king and his main wife and queen would appoint the palace women to different ranks and tasks: after the queen came the four wives called preah moneang or preah snang rank; then the preah neang-wives; the neak moneang-wives and the neak neang-wives.  Other palace women became servants, singers or dancers. The harem women could be seen in public only on a few ceremonial occasions but were otherwise not allowed contact with the outside world and communicated with it through go-betweens in the shape of female old palace women servants called ak yeay chastum. 

When Cambodia became a French colony, the French colonial officials viewed an abolition of the royal harem and an emancipation of the harem women as a part of modernization, as well as a way of cutting the costs of the royal court.  After the death of king Norodom in April 1904, the French officials took control of the royal finances, reviewed the allowances of each person in the royal palace, and reduced the number of the number of women that the king could support, effectively dissolving the harem.  King Sisowath (r. 1904–1927) did keep some of the No kang chao (concubines) he had prior to his accession, but no more were added, and the custom of giving daughters as tribute to the royal harem had waned by 1913; after this, the palace women, at least officially, were servants and staffed the royal ballet corps.

India

The harem likely existed in Hindu India before the Islamic conquest. It is for example mentioned in the Ancient stories of Buddha. However, it appears to have become more common and strict after the Islamic conquests. 

After the Islamic conquest of India and the loss of Hindu rulership, the gender segregation and seclusion of women practiced by the Muslim conquerors were adopted also by Hindus in India, where it became known as purdah.  It is noted that the whole society became more gender segregated after the Muslim conquests onward and men and women more separated; in Bengal, for example, where men and women had previously worked together reaping, men started to do the reaping alone and women referred to the more domestic task of husking.  Male Hindu rulers commonly had harems as well as Muslim rulers in India from the Middle ages until the 20th-century.  One of the factors why upper-class Hindu men started to seclude women in harems after the Muslim conquest was the practice of the Muslim conquerors to place the wives of defeated Hindus in their harems, and the disruption of the Hindu social system that followed from the mixing of Hindus and Muslims.  The seclusion of Hindu women was thus a way to preserve the cast.

Imperial China

Harem is also the usual English translation of the Chinese language term hougong (hou-kung), in reference to the Imperial Chinese Harem. Hougong refers to the large palaces for the Chinese emperor's consorts, concubines, female attendants and eunuchs. 

The women who lived in an emperor's hougong sometimes numbered in the thousands. In 1421, Yongle Emperor ordered 2,800 concubines, servant girls and eunuchs who guarded them to a slow slicing death as the Emperor tried to suppress a sex scandal which threatened to humiliate him.

Muscovite Terem
In Muscovite Russia the area of aristocratic houses where women were secluded was known as terem. However, aristocratic Muscovite women were not entirely secluded from mixing with men: it was a common custom for the lady of the house to greet a male guest with a welcoming drink ritual when he arrived. She was also waited upon male staff as well as female upon retiring to her chamber.

Western representations

A distinct, imaginary vision of the harem emerged in the West starting from the 17th century when Europeans became aware of Muslim harems housing numerous women. In contrast to the medieval European views, which conceived Muslim women as victimized but powerful through their charms and deceit. During the era of European colonialism, the "imaginary harem" came to represent what Orientalist scholars saw as an abased and subjugated status of women in the Islamic civilization. These notions served to cast the West as culturally superior and justify colonial enterprises. Under the influence of One Thousand and One Nights, the harem was often conceived as a personal brothel, where numerous women lounged in suggestive poses, directing their strong but oppressed sexuality toward a single man in a form of "competitive lust".

A centuries-old theme in Western culture is the depiction of European women forcibly taken into Oriental harems as evident, for example, in the Mozart opera Die Entführung aus dem Serail ("The Abduction from the Seraglio") concerning the attempt of the hero Belmonte to rescue his beloved Konstanze from the seraglio/harem of the Pasha Selim; or in Voltaire's Candide, in chapter 12 of which the old woman relates her experiences of being sold into harems across the Ottoman Empire.

Much of Verdi's opera Il corsaro takes place in the harem of the Pasha Seid—where Gulnara, the Pasha's favorite, chafes at life in the harem, and longs for freedom and true love. Eventually, she falls in love with the dashing invading corsair Corrado, kills the Pasha, and escapes with the corsair—only to discover that he loves another woman.

The Lustful Turk was a Victorian novel published in 1828. The novel focuses on a Western woman who is forced into sexual slavery in the harem of the Dey of Algiers. Similar themes were expressed in A Night in a Moorish Harem, an erotic novel of 1896 when a shipwrecked Western sailor is invited into a harem and engages in "illicit sex" with nine concubines.

The 1919 novel The Sheik, by E. M. Hull, and the 1921 film of the same name are probably the most famous novels from the "desert romance" genre which flourished after the conclusion of the First World War, involving relationships between Western women and Arab sheiks. The novel has received strong criticisms for its central plot element: the idea that rape leads to love, i.e. forced seduction. Other criticisms have been directed at ideas closely related to the central rape plot: that for women, sexual submission is a necessary and natural condition; and that rape is excused by marriage. Historians have also criticized the orientalist portrayal of the Arabs in the novel and the film.

Angelique and the Sultan, part of the Angélique historical novel series by Anne and Serge Golon and later made into a film, has the theme of a 17th Century French noblewoman captured by pirates and taken into the harem of the King of Morocco. Thereupon, she stabs the King with his own dagger when he tries to have sex with her and stages a daring escape.

The Russian writer Leonid Solovyov, adapting the Middle Eastern and Central Asian folktales of Nasreddin into his book Возмутитель спокойствия (English translations under the varying titles "The Beggar in the Harem: Impudent Adventures in Old Bukhara", 1956, and "The Tale of Hodja Nasreddin: Disturber of the Peace", 2009) added prominently the theme of Nasreddin's beloved being taken into the harem of the Emir of Bukhara and the protagonist's efforts to extract her from there - a theme completely absent from the original folktales.

A Study in Scarlet, the first of Conan Doyle's Sherlock Holmes mysteries, applies many of the above conventions to the historically different phenomenon of Mormon polygamous marriage. In the wild days of the early Mormon settlement of Utah, the protagonist's beloved is kidnapped and placed against her will in the harem of a Mormon elder, where she dies. Having failed to rescue her, the protagonist is bent on deadly revenge on the kidnappers - which is the background to the mystery solved by Holmes.

In H.G. Wells' The War in the Air, civilization breaks down due to global war. With the world reverting to barbarism, a strongman takes over a town and among other things starts forcing young women into a harem which he is building up. The protagonist must fight and kill him in order to save his girlfriend from being included.

Science Fiction writer Poul Anderson included among the adventures of his Galactic Secret Agent Dominic Flandry an episode where one of Flandry's love interests is forcibly taken into the harem of the corrupt planetary governor Harald and must be rescued. The far-future harem described follows the well-established literary depictions of a harem, except that the place of the traditional eunuchs is taken by  extraterrestrials.

Image gallery
Many Western artists have depicted their imaginary conceptions of the harem.

See also

People
Concubine
Eunuch
Odalisque
Pilegesh

Places
Arcadia (utopia)
Gynaeceum
Turkish bath (hammam)
Ōoku
Seraglio
Zenana

Other
Culture of the Ottoman Empire
Harem (genre)
Hypergamy
Imperial Chinese harem system
Ottoman Imperial Harem
Islamic views on concubinage
Kippumjo
Mughal Harem
History of concubinage in the Muslim world
Women-only space

Bibliography

Citations

Sources

Further reading
İlhan Akşit. The Mystery of the Ottoman Harem. Akşit Kültür Turizm Yayınları. 
Alev Lytle Croutier. Harem: The World Behind the Veil, reprint ed. Abbeville Publishing Group (Abbeville Press, Inc.), 1998.  (first published by Abbeville Press in 1989).
Alev Lytle Croutier. Harem: The World Behind the Veil, 25th anniversary edition. New York Abbeville Press, 2014 
Alan Duben, Cem Behar, Richard Smith (Series editor), Jan De Vries (Series editor), Paul Johnson (Series editor), Keith Wrightson (Series editor). Istanbul Households: Marriage, Family and Fertility, 1880-1940, new ed. Cambridge University Press, 2002. 
John Freely. Inside the Seraglio: Private Lives of the Sultans in Istanbul: The Sultan's Harem, new ed. Penguin (Non-Classics), 2001. 
Shapi Kaziev. Concubines. The secret life of the eastern harem 

Reina Lewis. Rethinking Orientalism: Women, Travel, And The Ottoman Harem. Rutgers University Press, 2004 
Fatima Mernissi. Dreams of Trespass: Tales of a Harem Girlhood. Perseus, 1994

N. M. Penzer. The Harēm : Inside the Grand Seraglio of the Turkish Sultans. Dover Publications, 2005.  (reissue of: The Harēm: An Account of the Institution as it Existed in the Palace of the Turkish Sultans with a History of the Grand Seraglio from its Foundation to the Present Time; 1936)
M. Saalih. Harem Girl: A Harem Girl's Journal reprint ed. Delta, 2002.  (erotic novel)
Royal French Women in the Ottoman Sultans' Harem: The Political Uses of Fabricated Accounts from the Sixteenth to the Twenty-first Century

External links

 Harem in the Ottoman Empire (English)
 Some paintings of harems
 Popular culture depictions of harems
 Harem Novel From Aslı Sancar
 

 
Arab culture
Islamic architectural elements
Islamic culture
Ottoman culture
Islamic terminology
Total institutions 
Women's quarters
Rooms
Sexuality in the Middle East